The Defence Institute of Physiology & Allied Sciences (DIPAS) is an Indian defence laboratory of the Defence Research and Development Organisation (DRDO). Located in Delhi, it conducts physiological and biomedical research to improve human performance in extreme and wartime environments. DIPAS is organized under the Life Sciences Directorate of DRDO. The present director of DIPAS is Dr. Rajeev Kumar.

History
Research in military physiology began in 1950 through a small group of scientists and medical physiologists at Defence Science Laboratory, Delhi. In 1962, a full-fledged laboratory was established with the thrust area of high altitude physiology, nutrition and biochemistry of human in severe stress environment and ergonomic assessment of workstations and man-machine interface.

DIPAS was officially established on 20 September 1962. In 1968, the laboratory was relocated within the premises of Army base Hospital, Delhi Cantonment. In 1993, the lab was shifted to its present permanent premise at Lucknow Road, Timarpur, Delhi.

Dr Shashi Bala Singh, DS & DG (LS) served as Director, DIPAS from 1 December 2010 to 30 November 2016 and after that Dr Bhuvnesh Kumar, OS Served as Director DIPAS till 31 August 2020.
Dr Rajeev Varshney, Sc G assumed the charge of Director DIPAS w.e.f 1 Sep 2020.

Research Area
High & Extreme Altitude Physiology
Heat, Cold & Polar Physiology
Exercise Physiology
Neurophysiology
Yoga & Adaptogens for Performance improvement
Clinical and cellular Biochemistry
Anthropometric Database of Indian Soldiers
Nutrition for Armed Forces
Man-Machine Interface: Ergonomics
Occupation Health & Toxicology
Herbal Intervention - Phytochemistry
Immunomodulation & Vaccine agents
Genomics & Proteomics: Molecular markers
Biomedical Engineering & Nanotechnology

Projects and Products
High & Extreme Altitude Physiology Heat, Cold & Polar Physiology Exercise Physiology Neurophysiology Yoga & Adaptogens for Performance improvement Clinical and cellular Biochemistry Anthropometric Database of Indian Soldiers Nutrition for Armed Forces Man-Machine Interface: Ergonomics Occupation Health & Toxicology Herbal Intervention - Phytochemistry Immunomodulation & Vaccine agents Genomics & Proteomics: Molecular markers Biomedical Engineering & Nanotechnology

Technologies for Civilian use

References

External links
 DIPAS Home Page

1962 establishments in Delhi
Government agencies established in 1962
Defence Research and Development Organisation laboratories
Research institutes in Delhi
Research and development in India
Research institutes established in 1962